Marshall School, Dehradun is a co-educational central board of secondary education school in Dehradun, the capital of the state of Uttarakhand in India. The school has been showing consistent results in both the 10th and 12th examinations CBSE. The school is located on the East Canal road in Dehradun.

History 
Marshall School was founded in 1967 by Francis Russell Marshall, a British educator, with only five students.

Facilities 
Marshall has a well equipped computer lab with one computer per student.

Hostel 
The school has a hostel facility that is divided up by junior and senior grades, as well as by boys and girls.

Athletic courts 
Marshall School has separate athletic courts for indoor and outdoor sports. Tennis, basketball, and volleyball all have hard outdoor courts while badminton has an indoor court.

Competition 
The school organizes many events for integrated development of students, including a debate competition. The events attract students from around the valley and north India to participate every year. The school has four houses:
 Blue (Ashoka)
 Green (Shivaji)
 Yellow (Azad)
 Red (Pratap)

Every year these four houses compete among themselves to win different sport events, competitions and overall academics. The school organizes painting competitions, debates, sports and other activities on campus. A School Headboy and Headgirl are chosen every year.

Sports 
Regular sporting events such as basketball, cricket, badminton, hockey, volleyball, football, tennis, and gymnastics are organised by the school and professional sport coaches help students.

Affiliation 
The School is affiliated to Central board of secondary education. The school conducts both the standard 10th CBSE and the standard 12th cbse examinations.

References

External links 
 Marshall School Dehradun

Primary schools in India
High schools and secondary schools in Uttarakhand
Boarding schools in Uttarakhand
Schools in Dehradun
Educational institutions established in 1967
1967 establishments in Uttar Pradesh